Felice Arena is an Australian children's author, actor and playwright. He is best known for the bestselling and award-winning football-themed Specky Magee series; the action-packed bionic hero series Andy Roid; the sports-themed Sporty Kids; his acclaimed historical novels The Boy and the Spy and Fearless Frederic A Great Escape; and most recently his beginner-reader series The Besties.

Biography
Arena was born in Kyabram, Victoria, and attended La Trobe University, in Bendigo, Victoria. He graduated as a primary (elementary) school teacher but decided to pursue writing.

Arena is also an actor. He played the role of Marco Alessi in the Australian soap opera Neighbours for a year. He also starred in London West End musicals including Hair and Godspell.

Books
 Wish (2005)
 Stick Dudes #1 Water Fight Frenzy (2009)
 Stick Dudes #2 Champions of the World (July 2010)
 Stick Dudes #3 The Secret Four-ce (July 2010)
 Farticus Maximus #1 Other Stories that Stink! Australia (2008) UK (April 2010) Canada (Sept 2011)
 Farticus Maximus # 2 Stink-Off Battle of the Century Australia (2009) UK (April 2011) Canada (January 2012)
 Farticus Maximus # 3 Bottomus Burps of Britannia (Oct. 2010)
 Whippersnapper (August 2011)
 Andy Roid and the Superhuman Secret (April 2012)
 Andy Roid and the Field Trip of Terror (April 2012)
 Andy Roid and the Camp Howl Crusaders (July 2012)
 Andy Roid and the Heroes of the Night (July 2012)
 Andy Roid and the Turbine Runaways (Oct 2012)
 Andy Roid and the Sinister Showdown (Oct 2012)
 Andy Roid and the Unexpected Mission (Aug 2013)
 Andy Roid and the Tracks of Death (Aug 2013)
 Andy Roid and the Missing Agent (Sept 2013)
 Andy Roid and the Avalanche of Evil (Sept 2013)
 Sporty Kids – Footy! (May 2015)
 Sporty Kids – Swimming! (May 2015)
 Sporty Kids – Tennis! (August 2015)
 Sporty Kids – Soccer! (August 2015)
 Sporty Kids – Basketball! (April 2016)
  Sporty Kids – Handball! (April 2016)
 Sporty Kids – Cricket! (October 2016)
  Sporty Kids – Netball! (October 2016)
  Sporty Kids – Little Athletics! (February 2017)
  The Boy and the Spy (April 2017)
Fearless Frederic (April 2018)
  A Great Escape (March 2019)
  The Besties to the Rescue (January 2020)
  The Besties Show and Smell (January 2020)

Picture Books
 Sally and Dave, A  Slug Story Australia (2007) US (2008)
 Hey, Cat! June 2008

Book Series
 The Specky Magee series (co-written with Garry Lyon):
 Specky Magee (2002)
 Specky Magee & the great footy contest! (2003)
 Specky Magee and the Season of Champions (2004)
 Specky Magee and the Boots of Glory (2005)
 Specky Magee and a Legend in the Making (2006)
 Specky Magee and the Spirit of the Game (2007)
 Specky Magee and the Battle of the Young Gun (2009)
 Specky Magee and the best of Oz (2011)

Specky Magee
The Specky Magee series, written by Arena and his former schoolmate and Melbourne Football Club star Garry Lyon, have also been shortlisted for numerous Australian Children Choice awards—including three-time winner of the Young Australian Best Book Award. There are eight books in the series.

As contributor

References

External links 

 
 
 Specky Magee

Male actors from Victoria (Australia)
Australian children's writers
Australian male musical theatre actors
Living people
Writers from Victoria (Australia)
Year of birth missing (living people)
Australian children's book illustrators